The 2005 Tour de France was the 92nd edition of the Tour de France, one of cycling's Grand Tours. It took place between 2–24 July, with 21 stages covering a distance .

Teams

Cyclists
"DNF" indicates that a rider did not finish the 2005 Tour de France.  For when and why, see the list of Retirements/Withdrawals

See also
2005 Tour de France
List of teams and cyclists in the 2004 Tour de France

2005 Tour de France
2005